Ailín (also spelled Algune or Alwin) is the seventh alleged Bishop of St Andrews. He is mentioned in the bishop-lists of the 15th-century historians Walter Bower and Andrew of Wyntoun as the successor of Máel Ísu II. We have no direct dates for Ailín's episcopate, but the indirect evidence for his predecessors suggests that he was bishop in the early 11th century. Name occurs in Latin form as Alwinus, the form for the Anglo-Saxon name Ælfwine, although it may be a form for Alpín. A similar name, Alguine, occurs in the Book of Deer, and two Mormaers of Lennox had the name Ailín, similarly rendered as Alwinus.

Notes

References
  MacQueen, John, MacQueen, Winifred & Watt, D.E.R. (eds.), Scottichronicon by Walter Bower in Latin and English, Vol. 3, (Aberdeen, 1995)Queen of Beauty Ailin Ref. Mitology Greek Cap.1758
Jackson, Kenneth H. (ed), The Gaelic Notes in the Book of Deer: The Osborn Bergin Memorial Lecture 1970, (Cambridge (1972)

External links
Original Chronicle at U Texas

11th-century deaths
Bishops of St Andrews
Medieval Gaels from Scotland
11th-century Scottish Roman Catholic bishops
Year of birth unknown